The black stink sponge (Ircinia arbuscula), is a species of sea sponge in the family Irciniidae. This sponge is known around the Australian coast and around South Africa from the Cape Peninsula to Cape Agulhas.

Description 
The black stink sponge grows in crusts of 1–2 cm thick and 10–20 cm across. It is a black encrusting sponge which forms a mat on rocks. Its surface is textured, and the sponge is firm and slippery to touch. Its oscula are inconspicuous. When collected, the smell is distinctive.

Habitat 
This sponge lives on rocky reefs subtidally down to 180m.

References

Dictyoceratida
Sponges described in 1877